Mimi Chakraborty (born 11 February 1989) is an Indian actress, singer and politician. She is known for her work in Bengali cinema and television. Her debut film was Bapi Bari Jaa in which she played the female lead, Dola. 
She was listed as the most desirable woman in the Calcutta Times list of Most Desirable Women 2016 and 2020.

In 2019, she joined politics and contested from Jadavpur Loksabha Constituency in 2019 Indian general election as a Trinamool Congress candidate. She is a Member of Parliament in the 17th Lok Sabha from Jadavpur constituency.

Early life
Chakraborty was born on 11 February 1989. She hails from Jalpaiguri, a city in the Indian state of West Bengal. She spent her childhood in Arunachal Pradesh in Deomali, a town in Tirap district, but later moved back to her ancestral home in Jalpaiguri City with her family. She was educated in Holy Child School, Jalpaiguri and later at St. James' School, Binnaguri. She graduated with a Bachelor of Arts degree in 2011 from Asutosh College in Kolkata. Her parents live in Siliguri.

Career
Mimi Chakraborty was a model before starting her acting career. She participated in Femina Miss India. Her acting debut was with Champion.

Her second project was a TV serial Gaaner Oparey, produced by Ideas Creations. It aired on Star Jalsha from 28 June 2010 to 16 April 2011. Ideas Creations, the production house of Prosenjit Chatterjee together with Star Jalsha launched the mega-serial Gaaner Oparey to pay tribute to  Rabindranath Tagore on the 150th anniversary of his birth. The likes of Rituparno Ghosh (who was initial scriptwriter of Gaaner Oparey), Debojyoti Mishra (music director), and other noted personalities from the film industry were involved with the project.

Her debut film Bapi Bari Jaa was released on 7 December 2012.

Gaaner Oparey
Gaaner Oparey, was the musical journey between two artists, Bohemian Gora and traditional Pupe and their love and in the whole process reinventing Tagore's "music". The story revolved around a girl called Pupe from an orthodox Tagore-worshipping family and Gora, an extremely talented but care-free lad, who keeps on experimenting with Rabindra Sangeet. This TV show marks the beginning of a year-long celebration of 150th birth anniversary of Kabiguru Rabindranath Tagore.

Chakraborty portrayed the role of Pupe, a very talented singer, belonging to an orthodox Tagore worshipping family, who used to sing Rabindra Sangeet in traditional form in concurrence with her family values. She was brilliant in all the emotions and made Pupe iconic.

Bapi Bari Jaa

Chakraborty's film debut was in Bapi Bari Jaa in which she played the female lead, Dola. The film was produced by Prosenjit Chatterjee production house, Ideas Creations. The film was also the silver-screen debut of Arjun Chakrabarty (better known as Gora, the male protagonist from Gaaner Opaarey) who played the role of Bapi, the male lead.

Fashion

Chakraborty has been a part of Fame Fashion and Creative Excellence (FFACE) in different ways. In 2014, she unveiled the Edition 1 of the FFACE Calendar at Tantra, Park Hotel Kolkata. The same year she was a part of the conceptual greeting card produced by FFACE as the FFACE of DURGA promoting women empowerment.

Filmography

Television

Discography

Awards

References

External links

Mimi Chakraborty – Lok Sabha profile

1989 births
21st-century Indian actresses
Indian film actresses
Indian television actresses
Lok Sabha members from West Bengal
Living people
Trinamool Congress politicians from West Bengal
Actresses from Kolkata
Actresses in Bengali cinema
Asutosh College alumni
University of Calcutta alumni
People from Jalpaiguri
Bengali actresses
India MPs 2019–present
Indian actor-politicians
Women in West Bengal politics
Women members of the Lok Sabha
21st-century Indian politicians
21st-century Indian women politicians